June is a Marathi film released in 2021 about emotional healing, starring Neha Pendse and Siddharth Menon in lead roles. The film marked the debut of directors Vaibhav Khisti and Suhrud Godbole and was written by Nikhil Mahajan. The film deals with various social issues, including bullying, sexism, suicide and the generation gap.

Plot 
Neel is an engineering student who has failed his exams and hence has taken a break and returned to Aurangabad, his home where his disappointed parents stay. To avoid embarrassment, his father never reveals to other about Neel failing the exams but tells only about his break. Relations with his father are hence tensed.

Neha has married Abhijit and due to some marital issues needs her own space away from Abhijit. She comes to Aurangabad, to stay at Abhijit's childhood home, which is in the same housing society where Neel stays. She meets Neel and they get on wrong foot initially. Other society members also disregard her due to her habits of smoking and drinking. Neel and Neha get close as they get to know each other better. Neel takes Neha on various site seeing within the city which Neha finds amusing and Neel rejects them as boring historic monuments of Mughal era.

As they grow closer, they share their past. While in his hostel days, Neel's roommate was an ambitious fellow who gets bullied by other classmates for his unsophisticated mannerisms. He dreamed for scoring high and making his parents proud. Coming from a vernacular Marathi schooling, Neel promises him to help in his studies. However, fed up with bullying, he commits suicide by hanging to the celling fan and Neel finds himself guilty of it. Neel's girlfriend Nicky is unaware of all this. She is not sure if Neel and she would ever marry since they belong to different castes and her parents would not accept. However, she wants to experience making love with him. While in her bedroom, Neel is haunted by his thoughts as he sees the fan. Nicky feels she did something wrong and that he is disgusted because of her bodily hair. She tries shaving her legs; but cuts herself deeply. Neha is disgusted after knowing that Neel rejected his girlfriend due to such a trivial issue and that Nicky went ahead to the extent of injuring herself.

Neel misunderstand Neha's closeness and love and tries to kiss her; which she stops. She reveals her history of how she and Abhijit tried a lot to conceive a baby. However, due to her smoking and drinking habits, she had a miscarriage. Abhijit is supportive; but she blames herself. Next day, Abhijit comes to pick Neha back and they decide to start afresh. Neel also forgives Nicky and decides to study further dedicatedly. Neha departs with Abhijit, when the month of June begins and brings in fresh monsoon showers in the city, ending the summer.

Cast 
 Neha Pendse as Neha
 Siddharth Menon as Neel
 Resham Shrivardhan as Nicky
 Kiran Karmarkar as Neel's father
 Jitendra Joshi as Abhijit, Neha's husband
 Sneha Raikar as Neel's mother
 Nilesh Diwekar as Jaiswal, society member

Soundtrack 
Shalmali Kholgade, Bollywood playback singer known for her song "Pareshaan" (Ishaqzaade, 2012), debuted as music composer through the film. New video of the song "Baba" was released on 20 June 2021, i.e. International Father's Day which featured actresses Priya Bapat, Amruta Khanvilkar, Girija Oak Godbole, Gauri Nalawade, Mrinmayee Godbole, Resham Shrivardhan, Parna Pethe, Shalmali Kholgade, Anandi Joshi, Sanskruti Balgude along with Neha Pendse. The song is sung by Anandi Joshi with lyrics penned by Mahajan, who also wrote the film.

Release and reception 
The film June completed its principal photography in October 2019 within 18 days due to a limited budget. Many lead actors, including Menon and Pendse, did not charge for their services and contributed money toward its production. The film was set to release in June 2020. However, due to the COVID-19 pandemic, the film did not release. It screened in various festivals, including the Pune Film Festival, International Film Festival of Kerala, New York Indian Film Festival (NYIFF) and 51st International Film Festival of India. At the NYIFF, the film and Menon received nominations for Best Film and Best Actor; where Menon won the award. June was then publicly released and became the first film on the newly launched OTT platform Planet Marathi.

At the Filmfare Marathi Awards 2021, Pendse and Shrivardhan won awards in Best Actress and Best Debut Actress categories respectively. Pendse shared the award with Sai Tamhankar for the film Dhurala. In 2022, Menon won Special Mention award at the 68th ceremony of the National Film Awards.

News 18 in their review about the film called it "a piercing portrayal of class anxiety, moving on and beginning again" and appreciated the script, acting and face paced nature covering various social issues. IANS appreciated the same but also commented on flaws like how some protagonists are shown unchanged or how some changes of heart are sudden and not believable.

References 

2021 films
2020s Marathi-language films
Indian drama films